Events from the year 1770 in France

Incumbents
 Monarch – Louis XV

Events
Cemetery of Saint-Louis, Versailles established

Culture
27 October – First performance of the opera Les deux avares, written by André Grétry
Théâtre Déjazet established

Births
5 February – Alexandre Brongniart, chemist, mineralogist, and zoologist (died 1847)
25 March – Antoine Richepanse, revolutionary general (died 1802)

Deaths

14 March – Nicolas-Charles-Joseph Trublet, clergyman and moralist (born 1697)
19 April – Esprit Antoine Blanchard, musician (born 1696)
25 April – Jean-Antoine Nollet clergyman and physicist (born 1700)
30 May – François Boucher, painter (born 1703)
3 August – Guillaume-François Rouelle, chemist and apothecary (born 1703)
28 November – Charles-Jean-François Hénault, historian (born 1685) 
15 December – Pierre-Joseph Alary, ecclesiastic and writer (born 1689)

See also

References

1770s in France